The Kimberley Dynamiters are a defunct Senior Amateur ice hockey club that played from 1946-1981 in the Western International Hockey League (WIHL).

During their 18 seasons in the WIHL the  Kimberley Dynamiters played 646 games, and compiled a record of 325 wins, 306 losses and 15 ties.

In 1978 the Kimberley Dynamiters won the Allan Cup, defeating the Brantford Alexanders in the best of 7 final series 4 games to 1.

References

1946 establishments in British Columbia
1981 disestablishments in British Columbia
Defunct ice hockey teams in Canada
East Kootenay
Ice hockey clubs established in 1946
Ice hockey teams in British Columbia
Sports clubs disestablished in 1981
Western International Hockey League teams